Tectocepheidae is a family of mites belonging to the order Sarcoptiformes.

Genera:
 Tectocephalus Berlese, 1895
 Tectocepheus Berlese, 1896
 Tegeozetes Berlese, 1913

References

Sarcoptiformes